Hugh Charles (born January 7, 1986) is a former Canadian football running back. He was originally signed by the Minnesota Vikings as an undrafted free agent in 2007 before signing with the Saskatchewan Roughriders in 2008. He played college football at Colorado. He was traded to Edmonton in 2011.

Professional career

Saskatchewan Roughriders
In Charles' first season in the Canadian Football League, the 2008 CFL season, he only played in 2 games. In the following 2 seasons with the Roughriders Charles received minimal playing time, only accumulating 50 carries for 315 yards, with 5 touchdowns, in 3 years combined. Charles played the beginning of the 2011 CFL season with the Riders, appearing in 7 games. Charles was traded to Edmonton from Saskatchewan on Oct. 12, 2011 in exchange for a conditional selection in the 2014 CFL Draft.

Edmonton Eskimos
For the remainder of the 2011 season Charles only played in 2 games with the Eskimos. The 2012 CFL season was a breakout year for Charles. Charles played in 16 games of the 18 game regular season. He received 170 carries for 887 yards, with 6 rushing touchdowns. He added 32 pass receptions for 522 yards and 2 receiving touchdowns. On October 12, 2012, he also completed his first pass attempt, for 14 yards.

Charles played in 15 games in the 2013 CFL season: He missed a few games because of an injured hamstring. Charles received less rushing attempts in 2013 than he had in 2012, down to 112 for the season. He gained 605 yards on the ground with those carries and recorded 3 rushing touchdowns. Following the season Hugh Charles was re-signed by Edmonton through the 2015 CFL season. On June 21, 2014, just after the close of the CFL preseason, Charles was one of the final cuts for the Eskimos.

Saskatchewan Roughriders
Hugh Charles appeared in only one game with the Roughriders, rushing for 86 yards on 13 carries.

Calgary Stampeders
Charles was signed by Calgary on July 28, 2014.

References

External links
Edmonton Eskimos bio
Calgary Stampeders bio

1986 births
Living people
American football running backs
African-American players of American football
African-American players of Canadian football
Canadian football running backs
Colorado Buffaloes football players
Edmonton Elks players
Minnesota Vikings players
Saskatchewan Roughriders players
Calgary Stampeders players
Sportspeople from Tulsa, Oklahoma
21st-century African-American sportspeople
20th-century African-American people